William Caudill may refer to:
 William Abel Caudill, applied medical anthropologist
 William Wayne Caudill, American architect and professor
 Bill Caudill, American baseball pitcher